Abdelghani Djaadaoui, (born 27 June 1947) is a former footballer who played as a defender. He spent his career in France and played for Algeria. He also coached Algeria and is currently in charge of scouting and contacting Algerian footballers playing in foreign European leagues.

Club career

Rouen

Sochaux-Montbéliard

Le Havre

International career

Career statistics

Club
Source:

External links
 

1947 births
Living people
People from Béni Saf
Association football defenders
Algerian footballers
Algeria international footballers
FC Rouen players
FC Sochaux-Montbéliard players
Le Havre AC players
Ligue 1 players
Ligue 2 players
Algerian football managers
Red Star F.C. managers
Algeria national football team managers
21st-century Algerian people